The non-marine molluscs of Moldova are a part of the molluscan fauna of Moldova (wildlife of Moldova). A number of species of non-marine molluscs are found in the wild in Moldova.

Freshwater gastropods

Neritidae
 Theodoxus danubialis (Pfeiffer, 1828)
 Theodoxus euxinus (Clessin, 1886)
 Theodoxus fluviatilis (Linnaeus, 1758)
 Theodoxus transversalis (Pfeiffer, 1828)

Viviparidae
 Viviparus contectus (Millet, 1813)
 Viviparus viviparus (Linnaeus, 1758)

Valvatidae
 Borysthenia naticina (Menke, 1845)
 Valvata cristata Müller, 1774
 Valvata macrostoma Mörch, 1864
 Valvata piscinalis (Müller, 1774)

Bithyniidae
 Bithynia leachii (Sheppard, 1823)
 Bithynia tentaculata (Linnaeus, 1758)

Hydrobiidae
 Lithoglyphus naticoides (Pfeiffer, 1828)
 Potamopyrgus antipodarum (Gray, 1843)
 Turricaspia lincta (Milaschevich, 1908)
 Turricaspia triton (Eichwald, 1838)

Thiaridae
 Esperiana esperi (Férussac, 1823)
 Microcolpia daudebartii (Prevost, 1821)

Physidae
 Aplexa hypnorum (Linnaeus, 1758)
 Physa acuta Draparnaud, 1805
 Physa fontinalis (Linnaeus, 1758)

Lymnaeidae
 Galba truncatula (Müller, 1774)
 Lymnaea stagnalis (Linnaeus, 1758)
 Myxas glutinosa (Müller, 1774)
 Radix auricularia (Linnaeus, 1758)
 Radix balthica (Linnaeus, 1758)
 Radix labiata (Rossmässler, 1835)
 Stagnicola palustris (Müller, 1774)

Acroloxidae
 Acroloxus lacustris (Linnaeus, 1758)

Planorbidae
 Ancylus fluviatilis Müller, 1774
 Anisus septemgyratus (Rossmässler, 1835)
 Anisus spirorbis (Linnaeus, 1758)
 Anisus vorticulus (Troschel, 1834)
 Anisus vortex (Linnaeus, 1758)
 Bathyomphalus contortus (Linnaeus, 1758)
 Ferrissia fragilis (Tryon, 1863)
 Gyraulus acronicus (Férussac, 1807)
 Gyraulus albus (Müller, 1774)
 Gyraulus crista (Linnaeus, 1758)
 Gyraulus laevis (Alder, 1838)
 Hippeutis complanatus (Linnaeus, 1758)
 Planorbarius corneus (Linnaeus, 1758)
 Planorbis carinatus Müller, 1774
 Planorbis planorbis (Linnaeus, 1758)
 Segmentina nitida (Müller, 1774)

Land gastropods

Pomatiidae
 Pomatias rivularis (Eichwald, 1829)

Aciculidae
 Platyla polita (Hartmann, 1840)

Succineidae
 Oxyloma elegans (Risso, 1826)
 Oxyloma sarsii (Esmark, 1886)
 Succinea putris (Linnaeus, 1758)
 Succinella oblonga (Draparnaud, 1801)

Carychiidae
 Carychium minimum Müller, 1774
 Carychium tridentatum (Risso, 1826)

Cochlicopidae
 Cochlicopa lubrica (Müller, 1774)
 Cochlicopa lubricella (Porro, 1838)

Orculidae
 Sphyradium doliolum (Bruguière, 1792)

Valloniidae
 Acanthinula aculeata (Müller, 1774)
 Vallonia costata (Müller, 1774)
 Vallonia enniensis (Gredler, 1856)
 Vallonia excentrica Sterki, 1893
 Vallonia pulchella (Müller, 1774)

Pupillidae
 Pupilla muscorum (Linnaeus, 1758)

Vertiginidae
 Columella edentula (Draparnaud, 1805)
 Truncatellina claustralis (Gredler, 1856)
 Truncatellina costulata (Nilsson, 1823)
 Truncatellina cylindrica (Férussac, 1807)
 Vertigo angustior Jeffreys, 1830
 Vertigo antivertigo (Draparnaud, 1801)
 Vertigo moulinsiana (Dupuy, 1849)
 Vertigo pusilla Müller, 1774
 Vertigo pygmaea (Draparnaud, 1801)

Chondrinidae
 Granaria frumentum (Draparnaud, 1801)

Enidae
 Brephulopsis cylindrica (Menke, 1828)
 Chondrula tridens (Müller, 1774)
 Merdigera obscura (Müller, 1774)

Clausiliidae
 Balea biplicata (Montagu, 1803)
 Bulgarica cana (Held, 1836)
 Bulgarica vetusta (Rossmässler, 1836)
 Cochlodina laminata (Montagu, 1803)
 Cochlodina orthostoma (Menke, 1830)
 Laciniaria plicata (Draparnaud, 1801)
 Macrogastra borealis (Boettger, 1878)
 Ruthenica filograna (Rossmässler, 1836)
 Serrulina serrulata (Pfeiffer, 1847)

Ferussaciidae
 Cecilioides acicula (Müller, 1774)

Punctidae
 Punctum pygmaeum (Draparnaud, 1801)

Discidae
 Discus perspectivus (Megerle von Mühlfeld, 1816)

Euconulidae
 Euconulus fulvus (Müller, 1774)

Gastrodontidae
 Zonitoides nitidus (Müller, 1774)

Zonitidae
 Aegopinella minor (Stabile, 1864)
 Aegopinella pura (Alder, 1830)
 Nesovitrea petronella (Pfeiffer, 1853)
 Oxychilus glaber (Rossmässler, 1835)
 Vitrea contracta (Westerlund, 1871)
 Vitrea crystallina (Müller, 1774)
 Vitrea diaphana (Studer, 1820)

Milacidae
 Tandonia kusceri (Wagner, 1931)

Vitrinidae
 Vitrina pellucida (Müller, 1774)

Limacidae
 Lehmannia jaroslaviae Grossu, 1967
 Lehmannia marginata (Müller, 1774)
 Limax cinereoniger Wolf, 1803
 Limax maximus Linnaeus, 1758

Agriolimacidae
 Deroceras agreste (Linnaeus, 1758)
 Deroceras laeve (Müller, 1774)
 Deroceras reticulatum (Müller, 1774)
 Deroceras sturanyi (Simroth, 1894)
 Deroceras turcicum (Simroth, 1894)

Arionidae
 Arion circumscriptus Johnston, 1828
 Arion silvaticus Lohmander, 1937
 Arion subfuscus (Draparnaud, 1805)

Bradybaenidae
 Fruticicola fruticum (Müller, 1774)

Hygromiidae
 Euomphalia strigella (Draparnaud, 1801)
 Helicopsis instabilis (Rossmässler, 1838)
 Helicopsis striata (Müller, 1774)
 Lindholmiola girva (Frivaldszky, 1835)
 Monacha cartusiana (Müller, 1774)
 Monachoides incarnatus (Müller, 1774)
 Monachoides vicinus (Rossmässler, 1842)
 Perforatella dibotrion (Bielz, 1860)
 Pseudotrichia rubiginosa (Rossmässler, 1838)
 Trochulus hispidus (Linnaeus, 1758)
 Xeropicta derbentina (Krynicki, 1836)
 Xeropicta krynickii (Krynicki, 1833)
 Xerolenta obvia (Menke, 1828)

Helicidae
 Arianta arbustorum (Linnaeus, 1758)
 Cepaea vindobonensis (Férussac, 1821)
 Helicigona faustina (Rossmässler, 1835)
 Helix lutescens Rossmässler, 1837
 Helix pomatia Linnaeus, 1758

Freshwater bivalves

Unionidae
 Anodonta anatina (Linnaeus, 1758)
 Anodonta cygnea (Linnaeus, 1758)
 Pseudanodonta complanata (Rossmässler, 1835)
 Sinanodonta woodiana (Lea, 1834)
 Unio crassus Philipsson, 1788
 Unio pictorum (Linnaeus, 1758)
 Unio tumidus Philipsson, 1788

Sphaeriidae
 Musculium lacustre (Müller, 1774)
 Pisidium amnicum (Müller, 1774)
 Pisidium casertanum (Poli, 1791)
 Pisidium henslowanum (Sheppard, 1823)
 Pisidium milium Held, 1836
 Pisidium nitidum Jenyns, 1832
 Pisidium pulchellum Jenyns, 1832
 Pisidium subtruncatum Malm, 1855
 Pisidium supinum Schmidt, 1851
 Sphaerium corneum (Linnaeus, 1758)
 Sphaerium rivicola (Lamarck, 1818)
 Sphaerium solidum (Normand, 1844)

Dreissenidae
 Dreissena polymorpha (Pallas, 1771)
 Dreissena rostriformis (Deshayes, 1838)

Corbiculidae
 Corbicula fluminea (Müller, 1774)

Cardiidae
 Hypanis colorata (Eichwald, 1829)
 Hypanis laeviuscula (Martens, 1874)
 Hypanis plicata (Eichwald, 1829)
 Hypanis pontica (Eichwald, 1838)

See also

Lists of molluscs of surrounding countries:
 List of non-marine molluscs of Romania
 List of non-marine molluscs of Ukraine

References

Molluscs
Moldova
Moldova